Inez Turner (born January 3, 1972 in Trelawny Parish) is a retired female sprinter and middle-distance runner from Jamaica.

Career
In 1991 she  was awarded the Austin Sealy Trophy for the most outstanding athlete of the 1991 CARIFTA Games. She won the 800m gold at the 1994 Commonwealth Games.  Together with Lorraine Fenton, Deon Hemmings and Sandie Richards she claimed a bronze medal in the women's 4 x 400 metres relay at the 1997 World Championships in Athletics.

Personal bests
400 meters - 51.38 (1993)
800 meters - 1:59.49 (1995)

International competitions

External links

Picture of Inez Turner

References

1972 births
Living people
Jamaican female sprinters
Jamaican female middle-distance runners
Olympic athletes of Jamaica
Athletes (track and field) at the 1991 Pan American Games
Athletes (track and field) at the 1994 Commonwealth Games
Athletes (track and field) at the 1996 Summer Olympics
Commonwealth Games gold medallists for Jamaica
People from Trelawny Parish
World Athletics Championships medalists
Junior college women's track and field athletes in the United States
Commonwealth Games medallists in athletics
Pan American Games medalists in athletics (track and field)
Pan American Games bronze medalists for Jamaica
Universiade medalists in athletics (track and field)
Universiade silver medalists for Jamaica
Medalists at the 1993 Summer Universiade
Medalists at the 1991 Pan American Games
Olympic female sprinters
20th-century Jamaican women
21st-century Jamaican women
Medallists at the 1994 Commonwealth Games